Robin Hood, Jr. is a 1936 American musical romance film directed by Leslie Goodwins from a screenplay by Harry O. Hoyt.  The film stars Frankie Darro, Kane Richmond, and Muriel Evans.

Cast list 
Frankie Darro
Kane Richmond
Muriel Evans
John Merton

References 

Films directed by Leslie Goodwins